Gregory James Washburn (born December 3, 1946) is an American former professional baseball pitcher who appeared in eight games in the major leagues for the California Angels in 1969.

Washburn graduated from Coal City Hill School and was drafted by the Angels out of Lewis University in the first round of the 1967 amateur draft as the 19th overall pick. After almost 2 successful seasons in the minor leagues, he was promoted to the 1969 Angels in midyear. He made six appearances between June 7 and July 13, including two assignments as a starting pitcher at Anaheim Stadium. He was the losing pitcher in each start, against the Chicago White Sox on June 20 and the Seattle Pilots seven days later. He made two relief appearances in September 1969 to round out what would be his MLB career.

In eight games, he posted a won–lost mark of 0–2 with five games finished. In 11 innings pitched, he permitted 21 hits, ten earned runs, and five bases on balls, and recorded four strikeouts. His seven-year professional career, all spent in the Angels' organization, concluded in 1973.

References

External links

1946 births
Living people
Baseball players from Illinois
California Angels players
Hawaii Islanders players
Lewis Flyers baseball players
Major League Baseball pitchers
People from Coal City, Illinois
Quad Cities Angels players
Salt Lake City Angels players
San Jose Bees players